Ricardo Naboth (born February 13, 1978 in Mauritius) is a football player who currently plays for AS Case Créole in Réunion and for the Mauritius national football team as a forward. He is featured on the Mauritian national team in the official 2010 FIFA World Cup video game.

References 

1978 births
Living people
Mauritian footballers
Mauritius international footballers
Mauritian expatriate footballers
Expatriate footballers in Réunion
Mauritian expatriate sportspeople in Réunion
Association football forwards